= Pampa de la Isla =

Coordinates: 17°45′38.8″S 63°6′45.0″W

Pampa de la Isla is a township in Santa Cruz de la Sierra, Bolivia. The township is one of the key settlements of migrants from other parts of Bolivia.

The settlement was founded on August 14, 1960, with less than thirty families. As of 2011 the township has a population of around 200,000, divided into 47 Unidades Vecinales ('Neighbourhood Units') and around 186 barrios, being one of the most populous areas of the city.
